The DB Class 101 is a class of three-phase electric locomotives built by Adtranz and operated by DB Fernverkehr in Germany. 145 locomotives were built between 1996 and 1999 to replace the 30-year-old and aging Class 103 as the flagship of the Deutsche Bahn, primarily hauling Intercity services. This class encompasses the latest generation of locomotives of the Deutsche Bahn.

In the United States, the Bombardier ALP-46 is derived from the DB Class 101. The Bombardier Traxx shares a common heritage.

Background 

Around 1990, it became apparent that the current electric locomotives serving the heavy and fast (speeds over ) Intercity services, the Class 103, were wearing out. In addition, as part of the Program DB 90, and to cut costs, the theory of "Drive to Deterioration" (Fahren auf Verschleiß) was employed, which increased the strain even further.

Another class in similar service, the 60 units of the Class 120 three-phase locomotive, had also reached a stage where both their age and their design meant ever increasing technical problems. In addition, this class was something of a political step child, and the DB wished for a truly new design along the lines of the three-phase Class 120 locomotives.

In the beginning of 1991, the DB first called for designs for new high-performance all-purpose locomotives, using the program name Class 121. In addition, due to the separation of services into different areas of operation, suddenly an all-purpose locomotive was no longer required.

In December 1991 a second, Europe-wide bidding process was initiated, allowing the bidding companies more room for their own ideas. Over 30 designs were offered, from below  to over  output, including powered head units (Triebkopf) and units with only one driver's cab (similar to the E464, in service today in Italy). The latter idea was not pursued by DB since it proved too inflexible in service trials, and the price difference turned out to be minimal.

The non-German firms Škoda, Ansaldo and GEC-Alsthom were eliminated from the contest at an early stage, as the local construction methods and achievements of existing units did not find favour with the DB. On the other hand, German firms Siemens, AEG and Adtranz were able to shine with their modular locomotive designs which were customisable to the requirements of different customers and shared many common elements amongst each module.

Siemens and Krauss-Maffei already had a prototype of the EuroSprinter, class 127, in service, and AEG Schienenfahrzeugtechnik was able to very quickly present a working demonstration prototype of their concept 12X, the future 128001. ABB Henschel had no modern prototypes, but only a concept named Eco2000, and a technology demonstration based on two already 15-year-old rebuilt Class 120 locomotives.

To develop the components for the Eco2001, ABB Henschel used two Class 120 prototype locomotives, 120 004 and 005, which had been converted by ABB in 1992, in order to test new technologies in service. 120 005 received new electric power converters based on GTO-Thyristors, as well as new on-board electronics. 120 004 additionally received flexi-float bogies adapted from ICE units with driving rods instead of pivot pins, disc brakes, and utilising a new biodegradable polyol-ester cooling agent for its main transformer. Both of these reconfigured locomotives covered large distances in regular IC service without disruption.

To the surprise of many observers, in December 1994 DB signed a letter of intent with ABB Henschel which resulted in the order of 145 locomotives on 28 July 1995. The first class 101 locomotive was ceremonially presented on 1 July 1996. This unit, as was the case for the first three locomotives of this class, carried the orient red color scheme. ABB Henschel had by this time merged with AEG to become Adtranz, and some of the bodies were now being built at the Hennigsdorf factory, while others were built in Kassel. The bodies that were manufactured in Hennigsdorf were transported by flat bed trucks via the Autobahn to Kassel, where they were attached to the bogies built in Wrocław in Poland, and assembly was finalized. On 19 February 1997, the first class 101 locomotive was officially put into service.

Body Design

The class 101 locomotives initially stand out due to an unusually large slope at the front and back. The body had to be both as aerodynamic as possible, and at the same time be as cost-effective as possible. For these reasons the designers passed on a front with multiple curved areas. Further tapering of the front was also rejected, as this would have meant increasing the distance between locomotive and coaches, in cases where the two were separate. This would have negated the advantage of a more pointed front, due to the air turbulence created in the space between the vehicles.

In order to build support structures for the undercarriage, massive C-sections were welded together with steel plate of various strength in Hennigsdorf and in the Adtranz plant in Wrocław.

The front window panes can be utilised on either side of the locomotive, and are simply glued into the body without window frame. The roof of the driver's cab is part of the body, not the roof. The four doors on the sides lead directly into the driver's cabs and are made of light alloy.

The side windows in the driver's cab in the class 101 featured swiveled windows, in order to avoid a window well, which often proved to be susceptible to corrosion (the windows in class 145 and 152 were continued to be counter-sunk). All windows and doors are completely pressurized by means of a special sealant section.

The body side panels are 3 mm thick, and are carried by columnar sections, in between which parts of the cabling channels are laid. The side panels encompass the area from the back end of the driver's cabs up to the beginning of the sloped roof section, which is part of the removable roof sections. They end toward the top in a hollow section, which then takes on the roof sections. The side panels are connected together by two welded wicket/belt made up of steel plate.

The roof is made of aluminum and is made up of three separate sections. The fan grills and roof slope area belong to the roof sections, and can be removed as part of the roof, making the entire width of the body available for work on the machinery inside. The roof sections are resting on the side panels, their connecting belts, and the fixed roofs of the driver's cabs, and a floating seal is built into the sections. The roof sections are completely flat for aerodynamic reasons, with the exception of the pantographs, the signal horns, and the antenna for radio communication.

Since everything on the roof is mounted just a little under the top edge of the roof of the driver's cab, almost nothing catches any wind—even a lowered pantograph is difficult to detect. In comparison to other German locomotives, the pantographs are mounted "the wrong way around"—the hinges are pointing inwards. This is also for aerodynamic reasons—since the pantograph rocker needs to be located above the center of the bogies, the pantographs would have protruded into the raised roof of the driver's cab.

A special feature in class 101 units are the bogie side frame covers. They are mounted alongside the frame and cover the area down to the wheel bearings.

Bogies/trucks 
Adtranz and Henschel aimed to develop bogies for the class 101 that would allow for the maximum possible latitude for future evolution. In addition, the bogies were designed to be able to support the wheel set of other gauges. It is also possible to install a radially adjustable axle, such as is in service in class 460 of the Swiss Federal Railways, but the DB elected to go without this option.

Notwithstanding that the class 101 bogies are redeveloped from bogies on ICE trains, there are significant differences in their operation. The bogies of class 101 units make a compact impression, while the bogies on the ICE trains do not seem quite as compressed. The reason for this is that the bogies for the class 101 locomotives needed to be designed for both high speed stability and good performance in tight curves. This necessitated the use of a shorter wheelbase and large wheels. The bogies in the ICE trains did not need to take into account some of the tight curves that the class 101 trains need to handle.

Using these compact bogies resulted in such a significant decrease in the relative movement between body and bogies, and it became possible to run the connecting cables to the motor outside of the ventilation ducts. This simplified the construction and resulted in a longer life cycle.

The bogies consist of the two lateral main beams, and the two cross beams at each end; there is no middle welded cross beam. The transfer of pulling and braking power from bogie to locomotive takes place via two rods, which connect the locomotive via pivot pin to the bogie. The pivot pins are mounted with a slight slant to enable the formation of a right angle to the also slightly slanted rods.

The hollow axles, made from a chrome-molybdenum alloy, carry the massive wheels and the wheel set bearings at each end. The wheels are the typical German size, with a minimum of  after wear. The axles are mounted via hollow shafts into the gearbox casing, which, together with the traction motor, are designated the "integrated common drive train", or IGA. Both the manufacturer and the DB were thereby hoping for greatly reduced maintenance costs, with its outstanding (and in 120 004 proven) oil leak tightness, which is also to the benefit of greater environmental protection.

The power transmission to the axle and shaft takes place via a universal joint (also known as a Hooke's joint or Cardan joint) with rubber elements. The two wheels of each bogie are attached with six very large bolts, which are visible from the platform.

Brake system and traction motors 
On the hollow shafts there are two ventilated disc brakes, for which there is enough room due to the missing cross beam and pivot pin, as mentioned above. The disc brakes are separate and are ventilated from the inside. They can be serviced or replaced from below, without needing to take out the entire axle. During regular braking, primarily the regenerative brake is used, and the traction motor serves as the generator. The cooperation between disc brakes and regenerative brakes is controlled by a dedicated brake control computer.

Each wheel has its own brake cylinder, and each wheel set also features an additional brake cylinder for the spring brake, which operates as the hand brake/parking brake and can secure locomotive at up to 4 percent incline.

The traction motor blowers are controlled by built-in sensors, and are powered by an electrical auxiliary inverter. The cooling air is transported in a closed air duct, which keeps the engine room clean. This cooling air flows into the traction motor via flexible bellows, moves through the "integrated common drive train", and is exhausted via openings in the gear box.

The entire traction drive is mounted on an assisting beam in the center of the bogie, and attached to the outer sides via two pendulums. It is possible to mount in the center, since the bogies do not have pivot pins; the bogie is propped up above the frame by eight flexicoil springs. The resulting freedom of movement in all directions is limited by hydraulic buffers and rubber elements. By utilising this flexicoil suspension, many components, which either wore out or had to be expensively maintained, were eliminated.

Compressed air system 
The compressed air system in the class 101 is similar to the system found in other locomotives. The compressed air is then conducted through an air conditioning unit and is stored in two  main air reservoirs. The entire system is protected against excess pressure by two safety valves, which kick in at  pressure. The compressor is also individually monitored, and shuts off at oil temperatures above .

The compressed air system supplies the following components:
 brakes
 sand distributor
 flange oilers
 wind screen washer system
 train whistles

 Sand distribution system
To increase the transfer of train and brake power from the wheels to the rails, the locomotive can disperse sand onto the rails. The sand is stored in eight containers, one per wheel, on the undercarriage. When activated by the driver, compressed air is sent through the sand metering system, and sand is blown through downspouts to the front of the forward wheels in the direction of travel.

 Flange oilers
In order to conserve the wheel flange, a biodegradable fat/oil is automatically sprayed via compressed air into the channel between wheel flange and wheel surface of the front wheel, based on the current speed.

 Train whistles
On the roof of the each driver's cab are two whistles, which produce warning sounds of 370 and 660 Hz. These whistles are activated via a pressure valve located on the floor of the cab near the driver's feet, or via pneumatic pushbuttons located around the driver's cab.

Pantographs 
The two pantographs of type DSA 350 SEK (recognizable as half-pantographs, as opposed to the diamond-shaped full pantographs) were originally developed by Dornier, and built in Berlin-Hennigsdorf. Today, the firm Stemman-Technik GmbH in Schüttdorf are manufacturing and distributing these units. They weigh .

The pantographs are screw-mounted to the roof at three points. Pantograph 1 is connected directly through the roof to the main control switch in the engine room; pantograph 2 is connected via a cable splice running along the side wall of the engine room to the main switch. The contact shoes are outfitted with a monitoring system in case of contact shoe breakage. Inside of the contact shoe, which is made of graphite, runs an air channel, which is overpressurised. In case of breakage, the air escapes, causing the pantograph to automatically retract, preventing possible damage to the overhead contact wire.

The pantographs are raised using compressed air, which is provided at 5 bar to the lifting cylinder. Raising the pantograph takes 5 seconds, while retraction takes 4 seconds. The driver controls the pantograph via a push button on the driver's desk (Up, Down, and Down + Sanding for emergency cases are the settings). The choice of which pantograph to use can be left up to the locomotive by the driver, which would automatically use the back pantograph in the direction of travel, or, in double heading, where two locomotives are coupled, it would be the front pantograph on the front locomotive, and the back pantograph on the back locomotive. Otherwise the driver, using a switch located on the battery control table in driver's cab 1, may raise one or the other, or both together. This is primarily an advantage during shunting/switching operation, where otherwise the change from one driver's cab to the other would mean the automatic switching from one pantograph to the other. In cases where the pantograph is being switched, the unit that was in the down position is lifted first, and once it is successfully pushed up against the contact wire, the pantograph that was in service is lowered.

The compressed air for the lifting and lowering of the pantograph, as well as for the contact shoe monitoring system, are supplied via two teflon-coated hoses on the roof, which have to withstand the 15,000 volts of contact wire voltage.

Transformer 
In contrast to locomotives of other classes, the transformer in class 101 is hung underneath the floor of the engine room on the frame, which enabled a very clean and uncluttered configuration of the engine room. This also caused the design of the transformer to be quite different from previous locomotives. The tank is constructed of light weight steel, but needed to be rugged enough to withstand a minor derailment or other accident; hence, some areas were reinforced with stronger welded sections.

The transformer features seven electric coils:
 4 coils for the supply of the power converters with 1,514 volts and 1.6 MVA
 2 coils for the supply of the trainlines (which supplies power to all carriages for heating and cooling and other power needs) and disturbance current filters with 1,000 volts and 600 kVA
 1 coil for the supply of the three auxiliary inverters with 315 volts and 180 kVA
 1 coil for the supply of the battery charger, driver's cab heater and air conditioner, and pressure protection, with 203 volts and 20 kVA

The transformer is cooled by a cooling agent made of a polyol-ester mix, which is recirculated by two independent canned motor pumps; these pumps make the occurrence of leaks almost impossible. Each pump can be sealed off separately, and can therefore be easily replaced. In cases where one pump fails, the cooling agent remains in the transformer tank; the transformer is capable of providing power at 65% of full capacity with just one pump in operation.

Software and other control systems 

The class 101 units feature the automatic drive and brake control system (AFB, or Automatische Fahr- und Bremssteuerung), which assists the driver and enables the best possible acceleration and braking under all possible conditions. The AFB can also keep the locomotive at a constant speed.

Class 101 also was outfitted with the Superschlupfregelung ("super slip control"), which controls the maximum number of rotations of the wheels per minute, and can automatically limit the rotations in order to avoid damage to the wheel surface or switch on the sand. This enables the maximization of the functional grip between wheel and rail. This system requires very precise information on the current speed, which resulted in the installation of a radar system into the floor of the locomotive, which sends the required speed data to the computer system. It turned out that the radar was unnecessary, and that this control system functions well without the data provided by the radar.

The locomotives also feature the ABB-developed computerized 16-bit control system MICAS S. The control, monitoring, and diagnosis of the vehicle is done by a bus system. This type of system meant a large reduction in the amount of wiring, especially as compared to the class 120; much of the wiring is accommodated in the side walls of the body.

The central control unit (ZSG), which is at the core of the system, is present twice for redundancy. All data that is collected by the various on-board systems is sent to the ZSG for processing, and all commands that affect the vehicle are originated by the ZSG.

The ZSG consists of 4 processors, which monitor the train controls and safety systems, including the dead man's system. The safety system also includes the PZB 90, which enforces the adherence to signals and other regulations (i.e. approach to a stop signal at high speed, violations of prescribed speed) and may stop the train via emergency braking if necessary. Yet another safety system is the LZB 80, which keeps the train in constant contact with a central control point, where all trains on a line are monitored for location and speed. In the locomotives 101 140 to 144 the European Train Control System (ETCS) is being tested, which serves similar functions are just described, but is meant to do so on a Europe-wide basis.

Also included in the control systems is the electronic time table EBuLa, which assists in the tracking of scheduled times, speeds, temporary speed restrictions, and other irregularities on the line which is installed on every train of the DB AG.

The diagnostic system DAVID was also further developed from the ICE version in class 101. This system enables the monitoring and diagnosis of failures, and delivers possible solutions in real time to the driver and the maintenance depot. In addition, maintenance times are shortened, since the maintenance area can prepare for issues already identified by querying the system at any time, as opposed to just at certain points in the network, as is the case for the ICE version of this system.

Deployment 

The original plan called for the class 101 to be based in one of the main intercity traffic hubs in Germany, namely Frankfurt. The locomotive changes made necessary there by its terminus-type station would allow for the ideal alignment of running schedules and maintenance work of these locomotives.

It then turned out that, due to the ever-increasing number of ICE trains with control cars arriving in Frankfurt, the DB decision to only run push-pull-type trains into Frankfurt station, and the necessary high investment to create a new high-tech train depot at the station, this plan was reevaluated. At the same time, spare capacity was created at the well-regarded ICE depot in Hamburg-Eidelstedt, since the depot there was built to hold 14-center-carriage ICE trains, and only 12 center carriages were being used. This spare capacity would now be used for the maintenance of the class 101 units.

During the first years in this depot, the manufacturer Adtranz, in order to fulfill their warranty obligations, housed a team of 15 employees in Hamburg-Eidelstedt. In 2002 there were still two Adtranz representatives present.

Basing the class 101 locomotives in Hamburg still seemed more cost-efficient to the DB than the construction of a new depot somewhere else, even though it meant the hiring of new drivers in Hamburg for the sometimes complicated, but necessary shunting/switching work. The base at a relative "outpost" in the far north of Germany also created problems with the service scheduling of the units.

Every 100,000 km, the class 101 locomotives are sent to Hamburg for their periodic maintenance check (Frist), where minor technical issues are addressed. This depot also features an underfloor lathe for the reprofiling of the tyres. The locomotives were sent to the main railway workshop (Ausbesserungswerk, or AW) in Nuremberg for major maintenance during the first years; because of capacity issues at this AW, they sometimes were sent to the manufacturer in Kassel instead. Currently, the AW in Dessau is responsible for the major maintenance work on class 101 units.

Withdrawal 

After the already withdrawn 101 144, 101 112 became the second locomotive to be withdrawn in December 2020. The delivery of more new ICE units has resulted in a surplus of locomotives. The first two locomotives, 101 112 and 101 119 were scrapped at Opladen in September 2021, after having been stripped of their reusable spare parts. 

As Deutsche Bahn is also planning to replace the IC1 over the coming years, class 101 locomotives are expected to be withdrawn from 2023 onwards; a use could be found with DB Cargo, but currently no locomotives are required.

See also 

 Bombardier ALP-46, a US locomotive based on the Class 101
 Headstock

Bibliography 

 Baur, Karl Gerhard Im Führerstand. Baureihe 101. In: LOK MAGAZIN. Nr. 244/Jahrgang 41/2002. GeraNova Zeitschriftenverlag GmbH München, S. 60–62.
 
 Klee, Wolfgang. Die Hochleistungs-Universal-Loks der BR 101. In: Die Baureihen 101, 145, 152 und 182. Sonderausgabe 1/2001 EisenbahnJournal , S. 22 -39.

External links 

 Homepage über die Baureihe 101, Technik Fotos Werbeloks
 Homepage über die Baureihe 101
 fernbahn.de Beschreibung und Fotos der Baureihe 101
 European Railway Picture Gallery

Electric locomotives of Germany
15 kV AC locomotives
101
Adtranz locomotives
Bo′Bo′ locomotives
Railway locomotives introduced in 1996
Standard gauge locomotives of Germany
Passenger locomotives